Meadow Creek is a stream in the U.S. state of West Virginia.

Meadow Creek was named for the flat meadows along its course.

See also
List of rivers of West Virginia

References

Rivers of Fayette County, West Virginia
Rivers of Summers County, West Virginia
Rivers of West Virginia